Plexippus minor is a jumping spider species in the genus Plexippus that lives in the United Arab Emirates. The male was first described in 2010.

References

Salticidae
Spiders described in 2010
Spiders of the Arabian Peninsula
Taxa named by Wanda Wesołowska